Folke Bernadotte, Count of Wisborg (2 January 1895 – 17 September 1948) was a Swedish nobleman and diplomat. In World War II he negotiated the release of about 31,000 prisoners from German concentration camps, including 450 Danish Jews from the Theresienstadt camp. They were released on 14 April 1945. In 1945 he received a German surrender offer from Heinrich Himmler, though the offer was ultimately rejected.

After the war, Bernadotte was unanimously chosen to be the United Nations Security Council mediator in the Arab–Israeli conflict of 1947–1948. He was assassinated in Jerusalem in 1948 by the paramilitary Zionist group Lehi while pursuing his official duties. Upon his death, Ralph Bunche took up his work at the UN, successfully mediating the 1949 Armistice Agreements between Israel and Egypt.

Early life
Folke Bernadotte was born in Stockholm into the House of Bernadotte, the Swedish royal family. His father, Prince Oscar Bernadotte, Count of Wisborg (formerly Prince Oscar of Sweden, Duke of Gotland), was the second son of King Oscar II of Sweden; his mother, Ebba Munck af Fulkila, had been a lady in waiting to Victoria of Baden, the wife of Crown Prince Gustaf. Oscar had married Ebba without the consent of the King, and so was forced to renounce his Swedish titles; in 1892, he was granted the titles of Prince Bernadotte and Count of Wisborg by his uncle, Adolphe, Grand Duke of Luxembourg.

Bernadotte attended school in Stockholm, after which he entered training to become a cavalry officer at the Royal Military Academy. He took the officer's exam in 1915, was commissioned a lieutenant in 1918, and subsequently was promoted to the rank of major.

Bernadotte represented Sweden in 1933 at the Chicago Century of Progress Exposition, and later served as Swedish commissioner general at the New York World's Fair in 1939–40. Bernadotte had long been involved with the Swedish Boy Scouts (Sveriges Scoutförbund), and took over as director of the organization in 1937. At the outbreak of World War II, Bernadotte worked to integrate the scouts into Sweden's defense plan, training them in anti-aircraft work and as medical assistants. Bernadotte was appointed Vice Chairman of the Swedish Red Cross in 1943.

Diplomatic career

World War II

During the autumns of 1943 and 1944, he organized prisoner exchanges which brought home 11,000 prisoners from Germany via Sweden. While Vice-President of the Swedish Red Cross in 1945, Bernadotte attempted to negotiate an armistice between Germany and the Allies. He also led several rescue missions in Germany for the Red Cross. In April 1945, Heinrich Himmler asked Bernadotte to convey a peace proposal to Prime Minister Winston Churchill and President Harry S. Truman without the knowledge of Adolf Hitler. The main point of the proposal was that Germany would surrender only to the Western Allies (the United Kingdom and the United States), but would be allowed to continue resisting the Soviet Union. According to Bernadotte, he told Himmler that the proposal had no chance of acceptance, but nevertheless he passed it on to the Swedish government and the Western Allies. It had no lasting effect.

White Buses

Upon the initiative of the Norwegian diplomat Niels Christian Ditleff in the final months of the war, Bernadotte acted as the negotiator for a rescue operation transporting interned Norwegians, Danes and other western European inmates from German concentration camps to hospitals in Sweden.

In the spring of 1945, Bernadotte was in Germany when he met Heinrich Himmler, who was briefly appointed commander of an entire German army following the assassination attempt on Hitler the year before. Bernadotte had originally been assigned to retrieve Norwegian and Danish POWs in Germany. He returned on 1 May 1945, the day after Hitler's death. Following an interview, the Swedish newspaper Svenska Dagbladet wrote that Bernadotte succeeded in rescuing 15,000 people from German concentration camps, including about 8,000 Danes and Norwegians and 7,000 women of French, Polish, Czech, British, American, Argentinian, and Chinese nationalities. The missions took around two months, and exposed the Swedish Red Cross staff to significant danger, both due to political difficulties and by taking them through areas under Allied bombing.

The mission became known for its buses, painted entirely white except for the Red Cross emblem on the side, so that they would not be mistaken for military targets. In total it included 308 personnel (about 20 medics and the rest volunteer soldiers), 36 hospital buses, 19 trucks, seven passenger cars, seven motorcycles, a tow truck, a field kitchen, and full supplies for the entire trip, including food and gasoline, none of which was permitted to be obtained in Germany. A count of 21,000 people rescued included 8,000 Danes and Norwegians, 5,911 Poles, 2,629 French, 1,615 Jews, and 1,124 Germans.

After Germany's surrender, the White Buses mission continued in May and June and about 10,000 additional liberated prisoners were thus evacuated.

Bernadotte recounted the White Buses mission in his book The End. My Humanitarian Negotiations in Germany in 1945 and Their Political Consequences, published on June 15, 1945 in Swedish.

Felix Kersten and the White Buses controversy
Following the war, some controversies arose regarding Bernadotte's leadership of the White Buses expedition, some personal and some as to the mission itself. One aspect involved a long-standing feud between Bernadotte and Himmler's personal masseur, Felix Kersten, who had played some role in facilitating Bernadotte's access to Himmler, but whom Bernadotte resisted crediting after the war. The resulting feud between Bernadotte and Kersten came to public attention through British historian Hugh Trevor-Roper. In 1953, Trevor-Roper published an article based on an interview and documents originating with Kersten. The article stated that Bernadotte's role in the rescue operations was that of "transport officer, no more". Kersten was quoted as saying that, according to Himmler, Bernadotte was opposed to the rescue of Jews and understood "the necessity of our fight against World Jewry".

Shortly following the publication of his article, Trevor-Roper began to retreat from these charges. At the time of his article, Kersten had just been nominated by the Dutch government for the Nobel Peace Prize for thwarting a Nazi plan to deport the entire Dutch population, based primarily on Kersten's own claims to this effect. A later investigation by Dutch historian Louis de Jong concluded that no such plan had existed, however, and that Kersten's documents were partly fabricated. Following these revelations and others, Trevor-Roper told journalist Barbara Amiel in 1995 that he was no longer certain about the allegations, and that Bernadotte may merely have been following his orders to rescue Danish and Norwegian prisoners. A number of other historians have also questioned Kersten's account, concluding that the accusations were based on a forgery or a distortion devised by Kersten.

Some controversy regarding the White Buses trip has also arisen in Scandinavia, particularly regarding the priority given to Scandinavian prisoners. Political scientist Sune Persson judged these doubts to be contradicted by the documentary evidence. He concluded, "The accusations against Count Bernadotte ... to the effect that he refused to save Jews from the concentration camps are obvious lies" and listed many prominent eyewitnesses who testified on Bernadotte's behalf, including the World Jewish Congress representative in Stockholm in 1945.

UN mediator

On 20 May 1948, Folke Bernadotte was appointed "United Nations Mediator in Palestine", in accordance with UN-resolution 186 of 14 May 1948.
It was the first official mediation in the UN's history. This was necessitated by the immediate violence that followed the United Nations Partition Plan for Palestine and the subsequent unilateral Israeli Declaration of Independence. In this capacity, he succeeded in achieving an initial truce during the subsequent 1948 Arab–Israeli War and laid the groundwork for the United Nations Relief and Works Agency for Palestine Refugees in the Near East. The specific proposals showed the influence of the previously responsible British government, and to a lesser extent the U.S. government.
Bernadotte wrote that: "in putting forward any proposal for the solution of the Palestine problem, one must bear in mind the aspirations of the Jews, the political difficulties and differences of opinion of the Arab leaders, the strategic interests of Great Britain, the financial commitment of the United States and the Soviet Union, the outcome of the war, and finally the authority and prestige of the United Nations."

After Bernadotte's assassination, his assistant American mediator Ralph Bunche was appointed to replace him. Bunche eventually negotiated a ceasefire, signed on the Greek island of Rhodes. See 1949 Armistice Agreements.

Assassination

Bernadotte was assassinated on Friday 17 September 1948 by members of the group Lehi, a Zionist terrorist organization, commonly known in the West as the Stern Gang. Immediately after Bernadotte was pronounced dead, his body was moved to the YMCA, after which it was taken to Haifa and flown back to Sweden. Bernadotte was granted a state funeral, Abba Eban attended on behalf of Israel. Bernadotte was survived by a widow and two sons, a 12-year-old and a 17-year-old. He was buried in Prince Oscar Bernadotte's family tomb at the Northern Cemetery in Stockholm.

Planning and background
The Stern Gang saw Bernadotte as a stooge of the British and the Arabs and therefore a serious threat to the emerging State of Israel. Most immediately, a truce was in force, and Lehi feared that the Israeli leadership would agree to Bernadotte's peace proposals, which they considered disastrous. They were unaware the Israeli government had already decided to reject Bernadotte's plan and to take the military option.

The killing was approved by the three-man 'center' of Lehi: Yitzhak Yezernitsky (the future Prime Minister of Israel Yitzhak Shamir), Nathan Friedmann (also called Natan Yellin-Mor) and Yisrael Eldad (also known as Scheib). A fourth leader, Emmanuel Strassberg (Hanegbi) was also suspected by the Israeli Prime Minister David Ben-Gurion of being part of the group that ordered the assassination.
The assassination was planned by Lehi's Jerusalem operations chief, Yehoshua Zettler.

The attack
A four-man team, consisting of Yehoshua Cohen, Yitzhak Ben-Moshe (Markovitz), Avraham Steinberg, and Meshulam Makover, ambushed Bernadotte's motorcade in Jerusalem's Katamon neighborhood. The team left a Lehi base in a Jeep and set up a makeshift roadblock at Ben Zion Guini Square, off Hapalmach Street, and waited in the jeep. When Bernadotte's motorcade approached, Cohen, Ben-Moshe, and Steinberg got out and approached it, while Makover, the driver, remained in the jeep. Captain Moshe Hillman, the motorcade's Israeli liaison officer, who was sitting in the leading UN vehicle, called out in Hebrew to let them through, but was ignored. Cohen came up to Bernadotte's sedan and fired through an open window, pumping 6 shots into Bernadotte's chest, throat and arms and 18 into Colonel André Serot  who was seated to his left, killing both. Serot had swapped places in the motorcade to join Bernadotte and thank him personally for having saved his wife's life in a German concentration camp. Ben-Moshe and Steinberg shot at the tires of the UN vehicles, while Cohen finished the magazine by firing at the radiator. The driver of the sedan, Colonel Begley, got out and tried to grapple with Cohen as he fired his last shots, but was burned in the face by the gun flashes. Ben-Moshe and Steinberg then rushed back and mounted the jeep, which quickly accelerated down a side road, while Cohen ran away from the scene across a roadside field.

Following the shooting, Bernadotte's car sped to Hadassah Mount Scopus Hospital, despite damage to the radiator; the lead vehicle followed as its tires came apart. At the hospital, Bernadotte was pronounced dead. General Åge Lundström, who was in the UN vehicle, described the incident as follows:

In the Katamon quarter, we were held up by a Jewish Army type jeep placed in a road block and filled with men in Jewish Army uniforms. At the same moment, I saw an armed man coming from this jeep. I took little notice of this because I merely thought it was another checkpoint. However, he put a Tommy gun through the open window on my side of the car, and fired point blank at Count Bernadotte and Colonel Serot. I also heard shots fired from other points, and there was considerable confusion... Colonel Serot fell in the seat in back of me, and I saw at once that he was dead. Count Bernadotte bent forward, and I thought at the time he was trying to get cover. I asked him: 'Are you wounded?' He nodded, and fell back.... When we arrived [at the Hadassah hospital]... I carried the Count inside and laid him on the bed.... I took off the Count's jacket and tore away his shirt and undervest. I saw that he was wounded around the heart and that there was also a considerable quantity of blood on his clothes about it. When the doctor arrived, I asked if anything could be done, but he replied that it was too late.

All four members of the hit team made it to the religious community of Shaarei Pina, where they hid with local Haredi sympathizers. After a few days in hiding, they fled to Tel Aviv in the back of a furniture truck.

Investigation
Lehi leaders initially denied responsibility for the attack. Only later did Lehi take responsibility for the killings in the name of Hazit Hamoledet (the Homeland Front), a name they copied from a war-time Bulgarian resistance group.

Lehi was forcibly disarmed and many members were arrested, but nobody was charged with the killings. The Israel Police, along with the military police and security services, investigated the assassination, but failed to identify any of the participants in the assassination, and the case was eventually closed without any of the participants having been identified. It has been suggested that the reasons for the failure of the investigation were poor coordination between these bodies, which resulted in information that may have assisted the police not being turned over to them, and the lack of proficiency among police officers and investigators in the early days of the Israel Police. The murder case was identified as 148/48 in Israeli police records.

Yellin-Mor and another Lehi member, Mattityahu Shmulevitz, were charged with belonging to a terrorist organization. They were found guilty but immediately released and pardoned. Yellin-Mor had meanwhile been elected to the first Knesset. Betty Knut-Lazarus, a Lehi militant, and the granddaughter of composer Alexander Scriabin, was also imprisoned for being allegedly involved in the killing, before being subsequently released.

Years later, Cohen's role was uncovered by David Ben-Gurion's biographer Michael Bar Zohar, while Cohen was working as Ben-Gurion's personal bodyguard. The first public admission of Lehi's role in the killing was made on the anniversary of the assassination in 1977. The statute of limitations for the murder had expired in 1971. In 1988, two years after Cohen's death, Zettler and Makover publicly confessed their role in the assassination and confirmed that Cohen had killed Bernadotte.

The weapon which was used in the assassination (an MP 40, serial number 2581) was lost, and was only found again in 2018 during an inventory check in the Heritage house of the Israel Police, when an unidentified box was found to contain an MP 40 machine pistol and the curator, Shlomi Shitrit, decided to identify the history of the weapon. Prior to finding it, it was believed to have been destroyed.

Diplomatic fallout

The day after the murders, the United Nations Security Council condemned the killing of Bernadotte as "a cowardly act which appears to have been committed by a criminal group of terrorists in Jerusalem while the United Nations representative was fulfilling his peace-seeking mission in the Holy Land."

The Swedish government believed that Bernadotte had been assassinated by Israeli government agents. They publicly attacked the inadequacy of the Israeli investigation, and campaigned unsuccessfully to delay Israel's admission to the United Nations. In 1950, Sweden recognized Israel, but relations remained frosty despite Israeli attempts to mollify Sweden, such as through the planting of a Bernadotte Forest by the Jewish National Fund in Israel. At a ceremony in Tel Aviv in May 1995, attended by the Swedish deputy prime minister, Israeli Foreign Minister and Labor Party member Shimon Peres issued a "condemnation of terror, thanks for the rescue of the Jews and regret that Bernadotte was murdered in a terrorist way", adding that "We hope this ceremony will help in healing the wound."

Ralph Bunche, Bernadotte's American deputy, succeeded him as U.N. mediator. Bunche was successful in bringing about the signing of the 1949 Armistice Agreements, for which he received the Nobel Peace Prize.

Awards and memorials

In 1998, Bernadotte was posthumously awarded one of the first three Dag Hammarskjöld Medals, given to UN peacekeepers who are killed in the line of duty.

The university library at Gustavus Adolphus College in St. Peter, Minnesota, US is named after him.

Wife and children
In 1928 in Pleasantville, New York, Folke Bernadotte married Estelle Romaine Manville (1904–1984), whose family had founded part of the Johns-Manville Corporation.
They had four sons, two of whom died in childhood.
Count Gustaf Eduard Bernadotte of Wisborg (1930–1936)
Count Folke Bernadotte of Wisborg (born 1931), married Christine Glahns
Count Fredrik Oscar Bernadotte of Wisborg (1934–1944)
Count Bertil Oscar Bernadotte of Wisborg (born 1935) married Rose-Marie Heering (1942–1967) and Jill Georgina Rhodes-Maddox

Seven grandchildren were all born after Folke Bernadotte's death. His widow Estelle Bernadotte remarried in 1973.

In September 2008, it became official that before his marriage Bernadotte had a daughter with actress Lillie Ericson-Udde (Lillie Christina Ericson, 1892–1981):
Jeanne Birgitta Sofia Kristina Matthiessen, née Ericson (1921–1991), who was adopted by Carl G. W. Matthiessen (1886–1951) when he married Lillie Ericson in 1925.

Books
  (Swedish title: Slutet.)

See also
Raoul Wallenberg

References

Citations

General sources
 Kushner, Harvey W. (2002). Encyclopedia of Terrorism. Sage Publications. .
 Marton, Kati (1994). A Death in Jerusalem. Pantheon Books. .
 Schwartz, Ted (1992). Walking with the Damned: The Shocking Murder of the Man Who Freed 30,000 Prisoners from the Nazis. New York: Paragon House. .

Further reading 
Ben-Dror, Elad (2015). Ralph Bunche and the Arab-Israeli Conflict: Mediation and the UN 1947–1949, Routledge. .

External links 

 "M. Friedman: The road to freedom. An essay by survivor of the holocaust". From the Memory Project, United States Holocaust Memorial Museum
 Yehoshua Zettler – Daily Telegraph obituary
 Photo LIFE archive Bernadotte Palestine August 1948
 
 Grave of Folke Bernadotte

1895 births
1948 deaths
20th century in Jerusalem
Assassinated diplomats
Assassinated Swedish people
Burials at Norra begravningsplatsen
Folke
Deaths by firearm in Israel
People murdered in Israel
Red Cross personnel
Swedish diplomats
Swedish Lutherans
Swedish nobility
Swedish officials of the United Nations
Swedish people murdered abroad
Swedish people of Finnish descent
Swedish people of French descent
Swedish people of World War II
Swedish terrorism victims
Terrorism deaths in Jerusalem
World Scout Committee members
The Holocaust and Sweden